The British Heavy Middleweight Championship was a top British wrestling championship found throughout the country's circuit. The title's history dates back to its foundation by Joint Promotions in 1953.

The championship was recognised and defended on matches screened by UK national television network ITV as part of the professional wrestling slot on World of Sport as well as standalone broadcasts.  Pre-publicity for these championship match broadcasts was given in ITV's nationally published listings magazine TVTimes  The entire 31 October 1987 edition of the standalone Wrestling broadcast was given over to Fit Finlay's recapture of the title from Chic Cullen in Bradford, 17 September 1987 and highlights of this match were included on the official ITV wrestling compilation VHS release Mayhem and Mystery.  Similarly, highlights of Alan Kilby's capture of the vacant title in a tournament final over King Ben in Preston, 7 October 1981, were included on official ITV wrestling compilation DVD release The Best Of British Wrestling A-Z.

Title history 
The title was founded in 1953 and remained in Joint Promotions until the mid-1980s when it was taken over by All Star Wrestling. The title remained active until the mid-1990s.

See also

Professional wrestling in the United Kingdom

References

External links

Mid-Heavyweight wrestling championships
National professional wrestling championships
Professional wrestling in the United Kingdom